Segismundo Martínez Álvarez (23 February 1943 – 21 April 2021) was a Spanish-born Brazilian Roman Catholic bishop.

Biography
Martínez Álvarez was born in Spain and was ordained to the priesthood in 1972. He served as bishop of the Roman Catholic Diocese of Corumbá, Brazil from 2002 until 2018.

He died from COVID-19 on 21 April 2021 in Corumbá at the age of 78.

Notes

1943 births
2021 deaths
21st-century Roman Catholic bishops in Brazil
21st-century Roman Catholic bishops in Spain
People from the Province of León
Deaths from the COVID-19 pandemic in Mato Grosso do Sul
Roman Catholic bishops of Corumbá